Platan is a brand of beer produced since 1598 in the Czech town of Protivín, South Bohemia.

Types of Platan beer 
 Platan Schwarzenbergské Pivo Knížecí 21 (10,6 % vol.), a strong lager.
 Platan Granát (4,6 % vol.), a Vienna lager.
 Platan Premium (5,0 % vol.), a lager.
 Platan Jedenáct (4,9 % vol.), a pale lager.
 Platan line (4,0 % vol.), a beer with reduced sugar content.
 Prácheňská perla – (6,0 % vol.), a Pilsner brewed in the traditional style of Prácheňsko.
 Platan Protivín (4,0 % vol.), draft lager.
 Platan Nealko, an alcohol-free beer.

Beer in the Czech Republic

References